Malkhaz (Georgian: მალხაზ) is a Georgian masculine given name. Notable people with the name include:
Malkhaz Abdushelishvili (1926–1998), Georgian scientist, anthropologist and academician 
Malkhaz Akishbaia (born 1972), Abkhaz-Georgian politician 
Malkhaz Arziani (born 1964), Georgian footballer
Malkhaz Asatiani (born 1981), Georgian footballer
Malkhaz Cheishvili (born 19??), Georgian rugby coach
Malkhaz Urjukashvili (born 1980), Georgian rugby player
Malkhaz Zarkua (born 1986), Georgian freestyle wrestler

Georgian masculine given names